Richard Kline (born 1944) is an American actor.

Richard Kline is also the name of:
 Richard H. Kline (1926–2018), cinematographer
 Richard S. Kline (1940–2020), game show producer/director
 Rick Kline, also known as Richard C. Kline,  American sound engineer

See also
 Richard Klein (disambiguation)